This is a list of books or any specific textual material that have been or are banned in India or parts of India.

Nationwide
This section lists books that are banned or once faced a nationwide ban in India (including in British India).

Statewide 
This section lists books that were banned by a state government. The Section 95 of the Code of Criminal Procedure, 1973 allows the state governments to declare any publication as forfeit.

Other challenged books
This section lists books that have been legally challenged to impose a ban or to exclude from a syllabus. Some books listed here are unavailable or were unavailable for some time in India or parts of it, due to pending court decisions or voluntary withdrawal by the publishers.

See also
 List of films banned in India
 Censorship in India

References

Book censorship in India
Indian literature-related lists
India law-related lists
Lists of prohibited books